Peter of Tarentaise or Pierre de Tarentaise may refer to:

Peter I of Tarentaise, archbishop (1132–1140) and popular saint; see Tiglieto Abbey
Peter II of Tarentaise, archbishop (1142–1174), Cistercian abbot and canonized saint
Pope Innocent V (c. 1225–1276), born Peter of Tarentaise